Dendrocoptes is a genus of woodpeckers in the (family Picidae) native to Eurasia.

Taxonomy
The genus Dendrocoptes was erected by the German ornithologists Jean Cabanis and Ferdinand Heine in 1863 with the middle spotted woodpecker (Dendrocoptes medius ) as the type species. The name combines the Ancient Greek dendron meaning "tree" and koptō meaning "to strike". A 2015 molecular phylogenetic analysis of the nuclear and mitochondrial DNA sequences from pied woodpeckers found that the genus Dendrocopos was polyphyletic. As part of the reorganisation to create monophyletic genera, three species from Dendrocopos were moved to the resurrected genus Dendrocoptes. The taxonomic committee of the British Ornithologists' Union recommended an alternative arrangement in which the genera Dendrocoptes and Leiopicus were combined into a larger Dendropicos. The yellow-crowned woodpecker (Leiopicus mahrattensis) is closely related to the species in this genus.

The genus contains three species:

References

 
Dendropicini
Bird genera
 
Taxa named by Jean Cabanis
Taxa named by Ferdinand Heine